Nurabad (also Romanized as Nūrābād) is a village in Zahray-ye Bala Rural District, in the Central District of Buin Zahra County, Qazvin Province, Iran. At the 2006 census, its population was 18, in 5 families.

References 

Populated places in Buin Zahra County